The 1991 Nabisco Dinah Shore was a women's professional golf tournament, held March 28–31 at Mission Hills Country Club in Rancho Mirage, California. This was the 20th edition of the Nabisco Dinah Shore, and the ninth as a major championship.

At age 35, Amy Alcott broke her own scoring record to win her third Dinah Shore by eight strokes over runner-up Dottie Pepper, who won the following year. Alcott entered the final round with a seven-stroke lead; it was her fifth major title and 29th and final win on the LPGA Tour.

Alcott and caddy Bill Kurre had jumped into the water next to the 18th green after her previous victory  and she was not going to repeat it. Host Dinah Shore had written the foreword in Alcott's recent book, stating that she would join her in the jump if she won again, so Alcott, Kurre, and Shore took running leap together. The jump became a continuous tradition three years later when Donna Andrews won, followed by Nanci Bowen

Past champions in the field

Made the cut

Missed the cut

Final leaderboard

References

External links
Golf Observer leaderboard

Chevron Championship
Golf in California
Nabisco Dinah Shore
Nabisco Dinah Shore
Nabisco Dinah Shore
Nabisco Dinah Shore
Women's sports in California